Dance Alloy was a modern dance repertory company based in the Pittsburgh, Pennsylvania's neighborhood of Friendship. It suspended operations in 2012 following a merger with the Kelly-Strayhorn Theater.

History and mission
The Pittsburgh Dance Alloy was founded in 1976 at the University of Pittsburgh as an artistic collective of nine dancers. Margaret Skrinar, Director of Dance, was the founder with the help of Yolanda Marino and Mary Goodman of the Pittsburgh Dance Council and guest artists Murray Louis, Kathryn Posin and Dan Wagoner. The first concert was performed in December 1976 at the Stephen Foster Memorial Theater and was directed by company choreographer,  Rebecca Rice. The Dance Alloy moved off-campus in 1980, and two years later Susan Gillis and Elsa Limbach were named co-artistic directors. Limbach became sole artistic director in 1984 and moved the company to studio space in the Carnegie Museum of Pittsburgh.

Established New York choreographer Mark Taylor became artistic director in 1991 and the company continued to grow, touring extensively both nationally and internationally, and offering dance classes in the community. In 1995 it expanded again, under the executive director Stephanie Flom, building its own state-of-the-art studios and employing six full-time dancers as well as numerous technical staff and arts administrators.

Dance Alloy's repertory included works by Claudia Gitelman, Lynn Dally, Kathryn Posin, Carolyn Brown, Elsa Limbach, Susan Gillis, Mark Dendy, Eiko & Koma, Bill T. Jones, José Limón, Victoria Marks, Charles Moulton, Mark Taylor, Douglas Nielson, Tere O'Connor, Pilobolus, Bill Evans, Rebecca Rice Flanagan, J Michael Kane, Gail Stepanek, Jerry Pearson and Elizabeth Streb. In 2003, Beth Corning was chosen to be the next artistic director. Corning was the force behind the reconstruction of the company, and "changed its name to better reflect the diversity of this genre." The last Artistic Director was Greer Reed-Jones.

Dance Alloy's mission was something called "Breaking the Fourth Wall." The back wall, when the audience looks at the stage, is referred to as the upstage. The next two walls are the wings or the sides of the stage, and the fourth wall is the barrier between the audience and the stage. This is the wall that Dance Alloy tried to break, the point being to completely engage the audience in the performance. They also set goals to immerse themselves in the community surrounding Dance Alloy, and they achieved this by offering dance education to adults and children of all ages.

On June 27, 2012, a merger was announced between the Kelly-Strayhorn Theater in East Liberty and Dance Alloy. Kelly-Strayhorn would manage daily operations of Dance Alloy and the Dance Alloy School but the dance company itself would not be active.

The final Company was under the artistic direction of Greer Reed Jones when it dissolved in 2012. Jones joined the Dance Alloy staff in June 2009. Along with the artistic director the company also employed five contracted dancers, including Maribeth Maxa, Stephanie Dumaine, Christopher Bandy, Michael Walsh and Adrienne Misko.

Staff of ALLOY School today

See also
 List of dance companies
 Theatre in Pittsburgh

References

External links
 Dance Alloy website (archive September 15, 2008)
 Kelly-Strayhorn Theater website
 Dance Alloy viewed on Mister Rogers' Neighborhood

Modern dance companies
Performing arts in Pittsburgh
1976 establishments in Pennsylvania
Dance in Pennsylvania